Lake Ribnica is a lake in Serbia.

Geography
Lake Ribnica is located in the Zlatibor mountains, in the west of Central Serbia an in the municipality of Cajetina. It is found  from the town of Kraljeve Vode, also known as Zlatibor, the tourist centre of the mountain. It is located on the route which runs to Mount Tornik and the monastery of Uvac.

Characteristics
Lake Ribnica is an artificial lake, built in 1971 due to the construction of a dam on the Crni Rzav, the "Black Rzav", one of the arms of the Rzav in Zlatibor ; the dam provides food and drinking water for the towns of Kralje Vode (Zlatibor) and Čajetina. The lake is abundant in fish, particularly gudgeon, trout, tench and silurus.

See also 
 List of lakes in Serbia

References

Ribnica
Zlatibor District